Petr Hošek (born 1 April 1989) is a Czech football forward who plays for Austrian club SC Wieselburg in Austrian lower division.

Career
In January 2011, he signed a three-year contract for Senica.

In the summer 2019, Hošek joined Austrian club SC Wieselburg.

References

External links

 Profile at fksenica.sk

1989 births
Living people
Czech footballers
Czech expatriate footballers
Association football forwards
SK Slavia Prague players
FK Senica players
FC DAC 1904 Dunajská Streda players
Flota Świnoujście players
FK Frýdek-Místek players
FK Fotbal Třinec players
FC Hlučín players
1. FC Tatran Prešov players
Slovak Super Liga players
2. Liga (Slovakia) players
I liga players
Czech National Football League players
People from Nýrsko
Czech expatriate sportspeople in Slovakia
Czech expatriate sportspeople in Poland
Czech expatriate sportspeople in Austria
Expatriate footballers in Slovakia
Expatriate footballers in Poland
Expatriate footballers in Austria
FK Ústí nad Labem players
Sportspeople from the Plzeň Region